Ek Shringaar — Swabhimaan (English: Self-Respect-An Adornment) commonly abbreviated as Swabhimaan is an Indian television series produced under the banner Rajshri Productions, by Sooraj Barjatya. The show premiered on 19 December 2016, on Colors TV and replaced the show Swaragini. This show is also available on Voot, Viacom18's Digital Platform. The show revolves around two sisters Meghna (Sangeeta Chauhan), Naina (Ankitta Sharma) and their mother Sharda (Prachi Shah) who has raised her daughters to be independent and self-sufficient. The series aired its final episode on 29 September 2017. It was later shifted to the 11:00 PM Time Slot. It was replaced by Colors TV Show Laado - Veerpur Ki Mardani at the 9:30 PM Primetime Slot.

Plot
Meghna and Naina are the beloved daughters of Sharda, a school teacher and single mother. After they graduate, they move to their uncle Vishnu's house with Sharda. Meghna falls in love with Kunal, the elder son of rich businessman Nandkishore. He rebuffs Sharda's proposal and humiliates her. But later, a royal marriage is fixed. Naina constantly bickers with kunal's younger brother Karan, who has health issues.

On the wedding day, Vishnu's wife Asha enrages Nandkishore who lays down condition that Meghna and Naina marry Kunal and Karan. Both couples marry, but Meghna vows to teach Nandkishore a lesson. His wife Nirmala lives under his domination. In reality her friend Sandhya is Kunal's real mother. Naina befriends and helps the shy Karan overcome his hesitations. Vishnu's son Vishal falls in love with and marries Nandkishore's daughter Khyati.

After many turns of events, Naina and Karan fall in love and get remarried. In the end Nandkishore realises his mistakes and begins treating everyone with love and respect.

Cast

Main cast

Sangeita Chauhan as Meghna Singh Chauhan (née Solanki): Sharda and Avinesh's elder daughter; Naina's elder sister; Vishal and Vaibhav's cousin; Kunal's wife (2016–2017)
Ankitta Sharma as Naina Singh Chauhan (née Solanki) : An IIT Topper, Sharda and Avinesh's younger daughter; Meghna's younger sister; Vishal and Vaibhav's cousin; Karan's wife (2016–2017)
Prachee Shah Paandya as Sharda Solanki: A teacher, Vishnu and Gopal's sister; Avinesh's widow; Meghna and Naina's mother; Vishal and Vaibhav's aunt (2016–2017)
Sahil Uppal as Kunal Singh Chauhan: Sandhya and Devraj's son; Nirmala and Nand Kishore's adopted son; Karan and Khyati's adoptive elder brother; Meghna's husband (2016–2017)
Samridh Bawa as Karan Singh Chauhan: Nirmala and Nand Kishore's son; Kunal's adoptive brother; Khyati's elder brother; Naina's husband (2016–2017)
Ahmad Harhash as vishal Pratap Singh  Khyati younger Brother (2016-2017)

Recurring cast
 Vinay Jain as Nandkishore Singh Chauhan: Sujan's son; Nirmala's husband; Kunal's adoptive father; Karan and Khyati's father (2016–2017)
Suchitra Pillai-Malik as Sandhya Singhania: Devraj's widow; Nirmala's friend; Kunal's mother (2016–2017)
Kanwarjit Paintal as Sujan Singh Chauhan: The patriarch of Chauhan family; Nand Kishore's father; Karan and Khyati's grandfather; Kunal's adoptive grandfather (2016–2017)
Shweta Mahadik as Nirmala Singh Chauhan: Nand Kishore's wife; Sandhya's friend; Kunal's adoptive mother; Karan and Khyati's mother (2016–2017)
Aashika Bhatia as Khyati Singh Rathore: Nirmala and Nand Kishore's daughter; Kunal's adoptive sister; Karan's sister; Vishal's wife
 Karan Singhmar as Vishal Singh Rathore: Asha and Vishnu's son; Meghna, Naina and Vaibhav's cousin; Khyati's husband
 Gulki Joshi as Sawri Dwivedi: Pushpa's daughter (2017)
 Shalini Arora as Asha Singh Rathore: Vishnu's wife; Vishal's mother; Meghna, Naina and Vaibhav's aunt (2016–2017)
 Jitendra Trehan as Vishnu Singh Rathore: Sharda and Gopal's brother; Asha's husband; Vishal's father; Meghna, Naina and Vaibhav's uncle (2016–2017)
 Manoj Bhaterjee as Gopal Singh Rathore: Sharda and Vishnu's brother; Kalpana's husband; Vaibhav's father; Meghna, Naina and Vishal's uncle
 Akshaya Bhingarde as Kalpana Singh Rathore: Gopal's wife; Vaibhav's mother; Meghna, Naina and Vishal's aunt
 Anand Satyadev as Vaibhav Singh Rathore: Kalpana and Gopal's son; Meghna, Naina and Vishal's cousin
 Khalid Siddiqui as Chief Minister Mehul Malik (2017)
 Manish Raisinghan as Shivraja "Shiva" Mahajan (2017)
 Anahita Jahanbaksh as Pushpa Dwivedi: Sawri's mother (2017)

Special appearances 
 Sidharth Shukla as Parth Bhanushali from Dil Se Dil Tak
 Rashami Desai as Shorvori Bhanushali from Dil Se Dil Tak
Jasmin Bhasin as Teni Negi from Dil Se Dil Tak
Keerti Gaekwad Kelkar as Simar Bhardwaj from Sasural Simar Ka

Awards and nominations

Crossover episodes
 Sasural Simar Ka on 21 April 2017 — Piyush who is possessed by Kaal, goes missing and Roshni tries to find her but fails but succeeds when Naina helps her. Simar motivates her when she tells her that she is going to compete against her sister.
 Dil Se Dil Tak on 16 & 19 June 2017 — Naina and Parth are trapped in a fire. Teni, Shorvori and Karan saves them.
 Dil Se Dil Tak on 3 July 2017 — Meghna, Kunal, Shorvori, Parth, Teni and Aman decides to meet at a resort in Chittorgarh. Sandhya asks a man to don't let them go there but don't harm anyone. The man tries to harm them for some personal reasons. Teni and Kunal saves Meghna from get drown in the water.
Dil Se Dil Tak on 14 & 17 July 2017 — Meghna invites Shorvori and her family to her house for Haryali Teej. Meghna, Naina, Shorvori, Teni, Kunal, Karan, Parth and Aman tries to clear all the misunderstandings between Sujan and Purshottam.

References 

Colors TV original programming
Hindi-language television shows
Indian drama television series
Indian television soap operas
2016 Indian television series debuts
Television shows set in Rajasthan
2017 Indian television series endings